Johannes Adam (born 1871, date of death unknown) was a German fencer. He competed at the 1908 and 1912 Summer Olympics.

References

1871 births
Year of death missing
German male fencers
Olympic fencers of Germany
Fencers at the 1908 Summer Olympics
Fencers at the 1912 Summer Olympics